Colm Galvin (born 2 February 1993) is an Irish hurler who previously played as a midfielder for the Clare senior team.

Galvin joined the team during the 2012 championship and immediately became a regular member of the starting fifteen. A Munster medalist in the minor grade and a Munster and All-Ireland medalist in the under-21 grade.
At club level Galvin plays with Clonlara.

Galvin missed the start of the 2015 All-Ireland Senior Hurling Championship as he was spending the summer in Boston. He returned from Boston at the end of June and rejoined the Clare hurling panel.

Galvin attended NUI Galway.

In February 2022, Galvin announced his retirement from inter-county hurling.

Honours
Clare
 All-Ireland Senior Hurling Championship (1): 2013
 All-Ireland Under-21 Hurling Championship (3):   2012, 2013, 2014
 Munster Under-21 Hurling Championship (3):   2012, 2013, 2014,
 Munster Minor Hurling Championship (2) 2010 2011

Individual
Awards
 GAA-GPA All-Star Award (1): 2013
 Bord Gáis Under-21 All-Star (2) : 2013, 2014

References

1993 births
Living people
Alumni of the University of Galway
Clare inter-county hurlers
Clonlara hurlers
People educated at St Munchin's College